Events from the year 1809 in France.

Incumbents
 Emperor – Napoleon I

Events
13 January - Battle of Uclés, French victory over Spanish.
16 January - Battle of Corunna, inconclusive battle between British and French forces.
8 February - Franz I of Austria declares war on France.
20 February - Second Siege of Zaragoza ends with French victory.
25 February - Battle of Valls, French victory over Spanish forces.
17 March - Battle of Villafranca, French garrison forced to surrender to Spanish.
27 March - Battle of Ciudad Real, French victory over Spanish forces.
28 March - First Battle of Porto, French victory over Portuguese forces.
28 March - Battle of Medellín, decisive French victory over Spain.
11 April - Battle of the Basque Roads, naval battle, British attack on French fleet.
16 April - Battle of Sacile, Austrian victory over French forces.
19 April - Battle of Teugen-Hausen, French victory over Austria.
19 April - Battle of Ratisbon begins.
20 April - Battle of Abensberg, French victory over Austria.
21 April - Battle of Landshut, French victory over Austria.
21 April - Battle of Eckmühl begins.
22 April - Battle of Eckmühl ends with victory for French over Austrian forces.
23 April - Battle of Ratisbon ends with French victory over Austria.
3 May - Battle of Ebelsberg, French victory over Austria.
6 May - Third Siege of Gerona begins as French fight to capture the Spanish garrison.
7 May - Battle of Piave River begins.
8 May - Battle of Piave River ends with victory for Franco-Italian forces over Austrian forces.
10 May - Battle of Grijó begins.
11 May - Battle of Grijó ends in Anglo-Portuguese victory over the French.
12 May - Second Battle of Porto, Anglo-Portuguese victory over French forces which retreat from the city.
21 May - Battle of Aspern-Essling begins as Napoleon attempts a forced crossing of the Danube near Vienna.
22 May - Battle of Aspern-Essling ends in defeat for Napoleon, the first time he had been personally defeated in over a decade.
23 May - Battle of Alcañiz, Spanish victory over French.
14 June - Battle of Raab, Franco-Italian victory over Austria.
15 June - Battle of María, French victory over Spanish.
5 July - Battle of Wagram begins.
6 July - Battle of Wagram ends with French victory over Austria, effectively bringing the War of the Fifth Coalition to an end.
8 July - Battle of Gefrees, Austrian victory over French forces.
12 July - Armistice of Znaim, ceasefire agreed, effectively ending hostilities between Austria and France in the War of the Fifth Coalition.
27 July - Battle of Talavera begins.
28 July - Battle of Talavera ends, inconclusive battle between French and British forces.
11 August - Battle of Almonacid, French victory over Spanish.
14 October - Treaty of Schönbrunn, signed between France and Austria, who were defeated and had to cede territory.
18 October - Battle of Tamamés, Spanish victory over French.
19 November - Battle of Ocaña, French inflicted upon the Spanish army its greatest single defeat in the Peninsular War.
26 November - Battle of Alba de Tormes, French army routed retreating Spanish army.
12 December - Siege of Gerona ends as Spanish forced to capitulate by disease and famine.

Births
4 January - Louis Braille, teacher, inventor of braille (died 1852)
15 January - Pierre-Joseph Proudhon, political philosopher (died 1865)
20 January - Napoléon Peyrat, author and historian (died 1881)
23 March - Jean-Hippolyte Flandrin, painter (died 1864)
24 March - Joseph Liouville, mathematician (died 1882)
27 June - François Certain de Canrobert, Marshal of France (died 1895)
8 November - Richard Hartmann, German engineering manufacturer (died 1878)

Deaths
27 March - Joseph-Marie Vien, painter (born 1716)
31 May - Jean Lannes, General (mortally wounded in battle) (born 1769)
6 July - Antoine Charles Louis de Lasalle, Cavalry general (killed in battle) (born 1775)

See also

References

1800s in France